Africa University is a "private, Pan-African and United Methodist-related institution." It has over 1,200 students from 36 African countries. It is located 17 km northwest of Mutare, Zimbabwe. It grants bachelor's, master's and PhD degrees in various programs.

History

Funding
Funding for Africa University is a two-part $20 million effort every four years. Ten million is apportioned to the 34,000+ United Methodist churches. The apportioned dollars provide for the day-to-day operating expenses of the university. The second ten million is raised through World Service Special Gifts for a permanent endowment. The interest and earnings on the permanent endowment provide scholarships and other financial aid for students as well as meet new and emerging programmatic needs of the university.

The Africa University Development Office located in Nashville, Tennessee, has the primary responsibility to raise funds for the permanent endowment as well as for capital projects. James H. Salley is the Associate Vice-Chancellor for Institutional Advancement and has supervisory responsibility for the Nashville office.

Structure
A 30-member board of directors chaired by Bishop Marcus Matthews governs Africa University. A founding member of Africa University's Faculty of Theology was elected the university's third chancellor on 8 December 2008. Professor Fanuel Tagwira, another founding member of the university's Faculty of Agriculture, was elected the university's third vice-chancellor in March 2009. As of 1 July 2014, Prof Munashe Furusa was unanimously elected as the new vice-chancellor.

Africa University is the first private, fully accredited, degree-granting United Methodist-related institution of higher learning on the continent of Africa as established and approved by General Conference. The university is Pan-African in design and spirit. Thirty six nations of Africa were represented in the student population for the 2015/2016 academic year. The majority of faculty and administrative staff are Africans. Professors and policy makers comprise permanent and visiting educators from the United States, Europe, and around the world. The official language at the university is English, which is also the official language of Zimbabwe.

There are thirty-two buildings on the campus with four currently under construction. The 32 buildings include 12 dormitories, 12 senior staff housing units, a chapel, and a state-of-the-art library complex. The four buildings under construction include a student clinic, two housing duplexes for senior staff, and the building for the Institute of Peace, Leadership, and Governance (IPLG).

Recently the Kent M. Weeks Archives was opened to collect all university and United Methodist Church records which are deemed to be of historic and research value.

Academics

There are currently 3 schools at Africa University, namely the College of Health, Agriculture and Natural Sciences; the College of Business, Peace, Leadership and Governance; and the College of Social Sciences, Theology, Humanities and Education. There is also the Africa University Information Technology Training Center.

College of Health, Agriculture and Natural Sciences
 Agriculture & Natural Resources
 Health Sciences

The Department of Agriculture and Natural Sciences offers a Bachelor of Science and Master of Science degrees in Agriculture and Natural Resources.

The Department of Health Sciences offers undergraduate degrees in nursing and health science management and a master's degree in public health.

College of Business, Peace, Leadership and Governance
 Business
 Computer Science and Information Systems
 Institute of Peace, Leadership and Governance

The Department of Business offers a number of training options for those interested in careers in business development and management, marketing, finance, and administration. At the undergraduate level, it has a full-time 4-year programme leading to degrees in accounting, economics, and management, marketing and computer science. It offers a full-time 2-year MBA program and a part-time EMBA program for senior managers and administrators.https://executivemba.wharton.upenn.edu/mba-or-emba/

The Institute of Peace, Leadership and Governance (IPLG) is a graduate institute which offers master's degrees in peace and governance, public policy and governance, Human rights law, Migration law and a Masters in intellectual property law. It also offers a PhD in Peace Leadership and Governance. It also offers trainings and short courses for lawyers, civil servants and policy makers. It has various partners including World Intellectual property organization (WIPO) and the Open Society Initiative in Southern Africa (OSISA)

College of Social Sciences, Theology, Humanities and Education

 Humanities
 Social Sciences
 Theology
 Education

The Departments of Humanities and Social Sciences offer three- and four-year full-time degree programs, in the form of either a Bachelor of Arts or Bachelor of Social Sciences with specialisation in English, Environmental Studies, French, History, Music, Portuguese, Psychology, Sociology, or Religious Studies. Two master's degrees are offered in child and family studies.

The Department of Theology offers a four-year full-time Bachelor of Divinity degree and a two-year full-time Master of Theological Studies degree.

The Department of Education offers a four-year full-time Bachelor of Arts degree and a two-year Bachelor of Education degree for secondary school teachers. The two-year program is specifically designed for teaching professionals who wish to upgrade their skills.

Notable alumni
 Charles Charamba, gospel musician, pastor, songwriter, producer
 Herbert Gomba, former mayor of the City of Harare
 Chido Govera,  farmer, campaigner, and educator
 Dr. Tonderai Kasu, substantive director of health and environmental services for Chitungwiza and former acting town clerk (acting chief executive) for Chitungwiza Town Council
 Michele Young-Stone, American novelist

References

External links

Official Web Site of Africa University
Official Web Giving Site for Africa University
 Africa University partners with Chevron to help the University of Agostinho Neto in Angola
https://www.mohe.gov.zm/ 
https://www.zaqa.gov.zm/higher-education-institutions/
https://www.hea.org.zm/

Universities and colleges affiliated with the United Methodist Church
Mutare
Educational institutions established in 1992
1992 establishments in Zimbabwe
Buildings and structures in Manicaland Province
Education in Manicaland Province
Africa University
Universities and colleges in Zimbabwe